Mwada is an administrative ward in the Babati District of the Manyara Region of Tanzania. According to the 2002 census, the ward has a total population of 13,017.

References

Babati District
Wards of Manyara Region